Levipalpus hepatariella is a species of moth of the family Depressariidae. It is found in most of Europe, except Ireland, Belgium, the Iberian Peninsula, Ukraine and most of the Balkan Peninsula. In the east its range extends to the eastern part of the Palearctic realm.

The wingspan is 20–25 mm. Adults have been recorded from August to the beginning of September.

The larvae feed on Arenaria species and Antennaria dioica. It was believed that the larvae first feed on the flower heads and then bore into the stems, but recently larvae of at least the later instars feed on the lower leaves of their host plant from silken tubes which extend into the soil.

References

External links
lepiforum.de

Moths described in 1846
Depressariinae
Moths of Europe